The foreign relations of the Russian Federation is the policy arm of the government of Russia which guides its interactions with other nations, their citizens, and foreign organizations. This article covers the foreign policy of the Russian Federation since the dissolution of the Soviet Union in late 1991.

As of present, Russia has critical diplomatic relations with Ukraine due to the 2022 Russian invasion of Ukraine.

The Kremlin's foreign policy debates show a conflict between three rival schools: Atlanticists, seeking a closer relationship with the United States and the Western World in general; Imperialists, seeking a recovery of the semi-hegemonic status lost during the previous decade; and Neo-Slavophiles, promoting the isolation of Russia within its own cultural sphere. While Atlanticism was the dominant ideology during the first years of the new Russian Federation, under Andrei Kozyrev, it came under attack for its failure to defend Russian pre-eminence in the former USSR. The promotion of Yevgeny Primakov to Minister of Foreign Affairs in 1996 marked the beginning of a more nationalistic approach to foreign policy.

Vladimir Putin's presidency lasted from January 2000 until May 2008, and again from 2012 to the present day. Under Putin, Russia has engaged in several notable conflicts, including against the neighboring countries of Ukraine and Georgia. He recognized the independence of new republics within those countries.

Relations with the United States in particular have sharply deteriorated between 2001 and 2022, while relations with the European Union have deteriorated especially since Russia's 2014 annexation of Crimea from Ukraine.

On 24 February 2022, Russia launched a large-scale invasion of Ukraine, prompting the imposition of substantial economic and political sanctions by the European Union, the United Kingdom, the United States, Canada, and other countries. The Russian government now has a specified "Unfriendly Countries List" which indicates those countries with which relations are now strained (or non-existent).

History

Foreign policies 

In international affairs, Putin made increasingly critical public statements regarding the foreign policy of the United States and other Western countries. In February 2007, at the annual Munich Conference on Security Policy, he criticized what he called the United States' monopolistic dominance in global relations, and claimed that the United States displayed an "almost unconstrained hyper use of force in international relations". He said the result of it is that "no one feels safe! Because no one can feel that international law is like a stone wall that will protect them. Of course such a policy stimulates an arms race.".

Putin proposed certain initiatives such as establishing international centers for the enrichment of uranium and prevention of deploying weapons in outer space. In a January 2007 interview, Putin stated that Russia is in favor of a democratic multipolar world, and of strengthening the system of international law.

While Putin is often characterized as an autocrat by the Western media and some politicians, his relationship with former U.S. President George W. Bush, former and current Brazilian President Luis Inacio Lula da Silva, former Venezuelan President Hugo Chávez, former German Chancellor Gerhard Schröder, former French President Jacques Chirac, and former Italian Prime Minister Silvio Berlusconi are reported to be personally friendly. Putin's relationship with Germany's former Chancellor, Angela Merkel, is reported to be "cooler" and "more business-like" than his partnership with Gerhard Schröder, who accepted a job with a Russian-led consortium after vacating office.

In the wake of the September 11 attacks on the United States, he agreed to the establishment of coalition military bases in Central Asia, before and during the US-led invasion of Afghanistan. Russian nationalists objected to the establishment of any US military presence on the territory of the former Soviet Union, and had expected Putin to keep the US out of the Central Asian republics, or at the very least extract a commitment from Washington to withdraw from these bases as soon as the immediate military necessity had passed.

During the Iraq disarmament crisis in 2002–2003, Putin opposed Washington's move to invade Iraq, without the benefit of a United Nations Security Council resolution explicitly authorizing the use of military force. After the official end of the war was announced, American president George W. Bush asked the United Nations to lift sanctions on Iraq. Putin supported lifting of the sanctions in due course, arguing that the UN commission first be given a chance to complete its work on the search for weapons of mass destruction in Iraq.

In 2005, Putin and former German Chancellor Gerhard Schröder negotiated the construction of a major gas pipeline over the Baltic exclusively between Russia and Germany. Schröder also attended Putin's 53rd birthday in Saint Petersburg the same year.

The Commonwealth of Independent States (CIS), seen in Moscow as its traditional sphere of influence, became one of the foreign policy priorities under Putin, as the EU and NATO have grown to encompass much of Central Europe and, more recently, the Baltic states.

During the 2004 Ukrainian presidential election, Putin twice visited Ukraine before the election to show his support for Ukrainian Prime Minister Viktor Yanukovych, who was widely seen as a pro-Kremlin candidate, and he congratulated him on his anticipated victory before the official election returns had been in. Putin's personal support for Yanukovych was criticized as unwarranted interference in the affairs of a sovereign state (See also The Orange revolution). Crises also developed in Russia's relations with Georgia and Moldova, both former Soviet republics accusing Moscow of supporting separatist entities in their territories.

Russia's relations with the Baltic states remain tense. In 2007, Russo-Estonian relations deteriorated further as a result of the Bronze Soldier of Tallin controversy.

Putin took an active personal part in promoting the Act of Canonical Communion with the Moscow Patriarchate signed 17 May 2007, which restored relations between the Moscow-based Russian Orthodox Church and Russian Orthodox Church outside Russia after the 80-year schism. In his annual address to the Federal Assembly on 26 April 2007, Putin announced plans to declare a moratorium on the observance of the Treaty on Conventional Armed Forces in Europe by Russia until all NATO members ratified it and started observing its provisions, as Russia had been doing on a unilateral basis.

Putin argues that as new NATO members have not even signed the treaty so far, an imbalance in the presence of NATO and Russian armed forces in Europe creates a real threat, and an unpredictable situation for Russia. NATO members said they would refuse to ratify the treaty, until Russia complied with its 1999 commitments made in Istanbul, whereby Russia should remove troops and military equipment from Moldova and Georgia. Russian Foreign Minister, Sergey Lavrov, was quoted as saying in response that "Russia has long since fulfilled all its Istanbul obligations relevant to CFE".

Russia has suspended its participation in the CFE as of midnight Moscow time on 11 December 2007. On 12 December 2007, the United States officially stated that it "deeply regretted the Russian Federation's decision to 'suspend' implementation of its obligations under the Treaty on Conventional Armed Forces in Europe (CFE)." State Department spokesman Sean McCormack, in a written statement, added that "Russia's conventional forces are the largest on the European continent, and its unilateral action damages this successful arms control regime." NATO's primary concern arising from Russia's suspension is that Moscow could now accelerate its military presence in the Northern Caucasus.

The months following Putin's Munich speech were marked by tension, and a surge in rhetoric on both sides of the Atlantic. As a result, Vladimir Putin stated at the anniversary of the Victory Day, "these threats are not becoming fewer, but are only transforming and changing their appearance. These new threats, just as under the Third Reich, show the same contempt for human life, and the same aspiration to establish an exclusive dictate over the world." This was interpreted by some Russian and Western commentators as comparing the U.S. to Nazi Germany.

On the eve of the 33rd Summit of the G8 in Heiligendamm, American journalist Anne Applebaum, who is married to a Polish politician, wrote that "Whether by waging cyberwarfare on Estonia, threatening the gas supplies of Lithuania, or boycotting Georgian wine and Polish meat, he [Putin] has, over the past few years, made it clear that he intends to reassert Russian influence in the former communist states of Europe, whether those states want Russian influence or not. At the same time, he has also made it clear that he no longer sees Western nations as mere benign trading partners, but rather as Cold War-style threats."

British academic Norman Stone in his article "No wonder they like Putin" compared Putin to General Charles de Gaulle. Adi Ignatius argues that "Putin... is not a Stalin. There are no mass purges in Russia today, no broad climate of terror. But Putin is reconstituting a strong state, and anyone who stands in his way will pay for it". Both Russian and American officials always denied the idea of a new Cold War. So, the US Secretary of Defense Robert Gates said yet on the Munich Conference: "We all face many common problems and challenges that must be addressed in partnership with other countries, including Russia.... One Cold War was quite enough." Vladimir Putin said prior to 33rd G8 Summit, on 4 June 2007: "we do not want confrontation; we want to engage in dialogue. However, we want a dialogue that acknowledges the equality of both parties' interests."

Putin publicly opposed to a U.S. missile shield in Europe, presented President George W. Bush with a counterproposal on 7 June 2007 of sharing the use of the Soviet-era radar system in Azerbaijan, rather than building a new system in Poland and the Czech Republic. Putin expressed readiness to modernize the Gabala radar station, which has been in operation since 1986. Putin proposed it would not be necessary to place interceptor missiles in Poland then, but interceptors could be placed in NATO member Turkey or Iraq. Putin suggested equal involvement of interested European countries in the project.

In a June 4, 2007, interview with journalists of G8 countries, when answering the question of whether Russian nuclear forces may be focused on European targets in case "the United States continues building a strategic shield in Poland and the Czech Republic", Putin admitted that "if part of the United States' nuclear capability is situated in Europe and that our military experts consider that they represent a potential threat then we will have to take appropriate retaliatory steps. What steps? Of course we must have new targets in Europe."

The end of 2006 brought strained relations between Russia and Britain, in the wake of the death of a former FSB officer in London by poisoning. On 20 July 2007, UK Prime Minister Gordon Brown expelled "four Russian envoys over Putin's refusal to extradite ex-KGB agent Andrei Lugovoi, wanted in the UK for the murder of fellow former spy Alexander Litvinenko in London." The Russian constitution prohibits the extradition of Russian nationals to third countries. British Foreign Secretary David Miliband said that "this situation is not unique, and other countries have amended their constitutions, for example, to give effect to the European Arrest Warrant".

Miliband's statement was widely publicized by Russian media as a British proposal to change the Russian constitution. According to VCIOM, 62% of Russians are against changing the Constitution in this respect. The British Ambassador in Moscow Tony Brenton said that the UK is not asking Russia to break its Constitution, but rather interpret it in such a way that would make Lugovoi's extradition possible. Putin, in response, advised British officials to "fix their heads", rather than propose changing the Russian constitution and said that the British proposals were "a relic of a colonial-era mindset".

When Litvinenko was dying from radiation poisoning, he accused Putin of directing the assassination, in a statement which was released shortly after his death by his friend Alex Goldfarb. Critics have doubted that Litvinenko is the true author of the released statement. When asked about the Litvinenko accusations, Putin said that a statement released posthumously of its author "naturally deserves no comment".

The expulsions were seen as "the biggest rift since the countries expelled each other's diplomats in 1996 after a spying dispute." In response to the situation, Putin stated "I think we will overcome this mini-crisis. Russian-British relations will develop normally. On both the Russian side and the British side, we are interested in the development of those relations." Despite this, British Ambassador Tony Brenton was told by the Russian Foreign Ministry that UK diplomats would be given 10 days before they were expelled in response. The Russian government also announced that it would suspend issuing visas to UK officials, and froze cooperation on counterterrorism, in response to Britain suspending contacts with their Federal Security Service.

Alexander Shokhin, president of the Russian Union of Industrialists and Entrepreneurs, warned that British investors in Russia will "face greater scrutiny from tax and regulatory authorities. [And] They could also lose out in government tenders". Some see the crisis as originating with Britain's decision to grant Putin's former patron, Russian billionaire Boris Berezovsky, political asylum in 2003. Earlier in 2007, Berezovsky had called for the overthrow of Putin.

On 10 December 2007, Russia ordered the British Council to halt work at its regional offices, in what was seen as the latest round of a dispute over the murder of Alexander Litvinenko; Britain stated that Russia's move was illegal.

Following the 2007 Peace Mission military exercises jointly conducted by the Shanghai Cooperation Organisation (SCO) member states, Putin announced on 17 August 2007, that the resumption on a permanent basis of long-distance patrol flights of Russia's strategic bombers that were suspended in 1992. The announcement made during the SCO summit in the light of joint Russian-Chinese military exercises, first-ever in history to be held on Russian territory, makes some believe that Putin is inclined to set up an anti-NATO bloc, or the Asian version of OPEC.

When presented with the suggestion that "Western observers are already likening the SCO to a military organisation that would stand in opposition to NATO", Putin answered that "this kind of comparison is inappropriate in both form and substance". Russian Chief of the General Staff Yury Baluyevsky was quoted as saying that "there should be no talk of creating a military or political alliance or union of any kind, because this would contradict the founding principles of SCO".

The resumption of long-distance flights of Russia's strategic bombers was followed by the announcement by Russian Defense Minister Anatoly Serdyukov during his meeting with Putin on 5 December 2007, that 11 ships, including the aircraft carrier Kuznetsov, would take part in the first major navy sortie into the Mediterranean since Soviet times. The sortie was to be backed up by 47 aircraft, including strategic bombers. According to Serdyukov, this is an effort to resume regular Russian naval patrols on the world's oceans, the view that is also supported by Russian media. The military analyst from Novaya Gazeta Pavel Felgenhauer believes that the accident-prone Kuznetsov is scarcely seaworthy, and is more of a menace to her crew than any putative enemy.

In September 2007, Putin visited Indonesia, and in doing so, became the first Russian leader to visit the country in more than 50 years. In the same month, Putin also attended the APEC meeting held in Sydney, Australia, where he met with Australian Prime Minister John Howard, and signed a uranium trade deal. This was the first visit of a Russian president to Australia.

On 16 October 2007, Putin visited Tehran, Iran to participate in the Second Caspian Summit, where he met with Iranian leader Mahmoud Ahmadinejad. Other participants were leaders of Azerbaijan, Kazakhstan, and Turkmenistan. This is the first visit of a leader from the Kremlin to Iran, since Joseph Stalin's participation in the Tehran Conference in 1943. At a press conference after the summit, Putin stated that "all our (Caspian) states have the right to develop their peaceful nuclear programmes without any restrictions". During the summit, it was also agreed that its participants, under no circumstances, would let any third-party state use their territory as a base for aggression or military action against any other participant.

On 26 October 2007, at a press conference following the 20th Russia-EU Summit in Portugal, Putin proposed to create a Russian-European Institute for Freedom and Democracy, headquartered either in Brussels, or in one of the European capitals, and added that "we are ready to supply funds for financing it, just as Europe covers the costs of projects in Russia". This newly proposed institution is expected to monitor human rights violations in Europe, and contribute to development of European democracy.

Russian President Vladimir Putin and ex-U.S. President George W. Bush failed to resolve their differences over U.S. plans for the planned missile defense system based in Poland and the Czech Republic, on their meeting in the Russian Black Sea resort of Sochi on 6 April 2008. Putin made clear that he did not agree with the decision to establish sites in the Eastern European countries, but said they had agreed a "strategic framework" to guide future U.S.-Russian relations, in which Russia and the U.S. said they recognized that the era in which each had considered the other to be a "strategic threat or enemy" was over.

Putin expressed cautious optimism that the two sides could find a way to cooperate over missile defense, and described his eight-year relationship as Russian president with Bush as "mostly positive". The summit was the final meeting between Bush and Putin as presidents and follows both leaders' attendance at last the NATO summit in Romania 2 April 2008 – 4 April 2008. That summit also highlighted differences between Washington and Moscow, over U.S.-backed proposals to extend the military alliance to include the former Soviet republics of Ukraine and Georgia. Russia opposes the proposed expansion, fearing it will reduce its own influence over its neighbours.

Fareed Zakaria suggests that the 2008 South Ossetia War turned out to be a diplomatic disaster for Russia. He suggests that it was a major strategic blunder, turning neighboring nations such as Ukraine to embrace the United States and other Western nations more. George Friedman, founder and CEO of private intelligence agency Stratfor, takes an opposite view; arguing that both the war and Russian foreign policy have been successful in expanding Russia's influence.

Current issues 

The mid-2010s marked a dramatic downturn in Russian relations with the West, with some even considering it the start of a new Cold War. The United States and Russia back opposing sides in the Syrian Civil War, and Washington regarded Moscow as obstructionist regarding its support for the Bashar al-Assad government.

In 2013, for the first time since 1960, the United States cancelled a summit with Russia, after the latter granted asylum to Edward Snowden.

The greatest increase in tensions, however, came during the Ukraine crisis that began in 2014, which saw the Crimean peninsula annexed by Russia.  Russia also inflamed a separatist uprising in the Donbas region. The United States responded to these events by putting forth sanctions against Russia, and most European countries followed suit, worrying about Russian interference in the affairs of central and Eastern Europe. October 2015 saw Russia, after years of supporting the Syrian government indirectly, directly intervene in the conflict, turning the tide in favor of the Assad regime. Russia's relations with Turkey, already strained over its support for the Assad regime, deteriorated further during this period, especially after the Turkish Air Force shot down a Russian jet fighter on 24 November 2015. In 2015, Russia also formed the Eurasian Economic Union with Armenia, Kazakhstan, and Belarus.

The Russian government dissaproves the expansion of NATO into Eastern Europe, claiming that Western leaders promised that NATO would not expand beyond its 1990s borders.

For decades, the dispute between Japan and Russia over the ownership of the Kuril Islands has hindered closer cooperation between the two countries. However, since 2017, high level talks involving Prime Minister Shinzō Abe have been ongoing in an attempt to resolve the situation.

Russia's power on the international stage depends on its petroleum revenue. If the world completes a transition to renewable energy, and international demand for Russian oil, gas, and coal resources is dramatically reduced, so will Russia's international power be. Russia is ranked 148 out of 156 countries in the index of Geopolitical Gains and Losses after energy transition (GeGaLo).

When Russia invaded Ukraine in 2022, its foreign policy underwent significant change, as it attempted to solidify its alliances in Africa, Asia and South America. Historically, the former Soviet Union and later the Russian Federation had good relations with modern states in those regions, being on the side of oppressed populations, such as during Apartheid in South Africa, and opposing imperialism worldwide. Later in 2022, many African and South American States abstained to vote against Russia in the UN security council for its military involvements in Ukraine. Russia's influence in Africa and South America is expanding, particularly in the areas of mining and security services. Most African and South American countries have a keen interest in cheap fossil energy, and have no sanctions in place against Russian entities.

Bilateral relations

Africa

Americas

Asia

Europe

Oceania

Perception

Global opinion 

Pew Research Center indicated that (as of 2015) only four surveyed countries have a positive view (50% or above) of Russia. The top ten most approving countries are Vietnam (75%), Ghana (56%), China (51%), South Korea (46%), Lebanon (44%), Philippines (44%), India (43%), Nigeria (39%), Tanzania (38%), Ethiopia (37%), and Uganda (37%). The ten countries with the most negative views of Russia were Pakistan (12%), Turkey (15%), Poland (15%), United Kingdom (18%), Jordan (18%), Ukraine (21%), Japan (21%), United States (22%), Mexico (24%), and Australia (24%). Russians own view of Russia was overwhelmingly positive at 92%.

Alleged aggressiveness 
The term has been used to refer to both Catherine the Great's 18th century agenda and 21st century Russian policies. In the 1990s supporters of NATO expansion into Eastern Europe claimed this would diminish "Russian aggression".

The post-Maidan conflict in Ukraine is usually blamed on "Russian aggression".
NATO-sponsored analysts have described what they call a cybernetic "Russian aggression" against Ukraine in the 2010s.

Multilateral

NATO and the European Union  

Russia is a member of the Commonwealth of Independent States (CIS), Union of Russia and Belarus, Organization for Security and Cooperation in Europe (OSCE), Paris Club, and the North Atlantic Cooperation Council (NACC). It signed the NATO Partnership for Peace initiative on 22 June 1994. On 20 May 1997, NATO and Russia signed the NATO–Russia Founding Act, which the parties hoped would provide the basis for an enduring and robust partnership between the Alliance and Russia—one that could make an important contribution to European security architecture in the 21st century, though already at the time of its signing doubts were cast on whether this accord could deliver on these ambitious goals.

This agreement was superseded by the NATO–Russia Council that was agreed at the Reykjavík Ministerial and unveiled at the Rome NATO Summit in May 2002. On 24 June 1994, Russia and the European Union (EU) signed a partnership and cooperation agreement. In recent years, tensions have heightened, as NATO members in Eastern Europe, especially Latvia, Lithuania, Estonia, and Poland, feel threatened by Russia. European Union imposed sanctions on Russian businesses and individuals in 2014, regarding the annexation of Crimea and alleged support for separatists during War in Donbas.

Former Soviet Republics and Warsaw Pact 
The non-Russian countries that were once part of the USSR have been termed the 'near abroad' by Russians. More recently, Russian leaders have been referring to all 15 countries collectively as "Post-Soviet Space," while asserting Russian foreign policy interest throughout the region. After the USSR was dissolved by the presidents of Russia, Ukraine and Belarus, Russia tried to regain some sort of influence over the post-Soviet space by creating, on 8 December 1991, a regional organization – the Commonwealth of Independent States. The following years, Russia initiated a set of agreements with the Post-Soviet states which were designed to institutionalize the relations inside the CIS. However, most of these agreements were not fulfilled and the CIS republics began to drift away from Russia, which at that time was attempting to stabilize its broken economy and ties with the West.

One of the major issues which had an influence on the foreign relations of Russia in FSU was the remaining large Russian minority populations in many countries of the near abroad. This issue has been dealt with in various ways by each individual country. They have posed a particular problem in countries where they live close to the Russian border, such as in Ukraine and Kazakhstan, with some of these Russians calling for these areas to be absorbed into Russia. By and large, however, Russians in the near-abroad do not favor active intervention of Russia into the domestic affairs of neighboring countries, even in defense of the interests of ethnic Russians. Moreover, the three Baltic states (Estonia, Latvia, and Lithuania) have clearly signaled their desire to be outside any claimed Russian sphere of influence, as is reflected by their joining both the NATO alliance and the European Union in 2004.

Close cultural, ethnic and historical links exist between Russia, Belarus and Ukraine. The traditional Russian perspective is that they are one ethnic group, with Russians called 'Great Russians', Belarusians 'White Russians' and Ukrainians 'Little Russians'. This manifested itself in lower levels of nationalism in these areas, particularly Belarus and Ukraine, during the disintegration of the Soviet Union. However, few Ukrainians accept a "younger brother" status relative to Russia, and Russia's efforts to insert itself into Ukrainian domestic politics, such as Putin's endorsement of a candidate for the Ukrainian presidency in the last election, are contentious.

Russia maintains its military bases in Armenia, Belarus, Kyrgyzstan, Moldova, and Tajikistan.

Russia's relationships with Georgia are at their lowest point in modern history due to the Georgian-Russian espionage controversy and due to the 2008 Russo-Georgian war, Georgia broke off diplomatic relations with Russia and has left the Commonwealth of Independent States.

Russia's relations with Ukraine, since 2013, are also at their lowest point in history as a result of the pro-Western Euromaidan revolution in Ukraine, the 2014 Crimean Crisis and the pro-Russian insurgency in Ukraine's Donetsk and Luhansk regions. Ukraine, like Georgia, has introduced a bill to the Verkhovna Rada to withdraw from the Commonwealth of Independent States, and Kyiv has begun the process of doing so.

In addition, Russia also maintains relations with Bulgaria, Czech Republic, part of the former East Germany, Hungary, Poland, Romania and Slovakia, the countries that were once part of the former Warsaw Pact, and furthermore, Albania. Russia also continues to maintain friendly relations with Cuba, Mongolia and Vietnam as well as third world and non-aligned countries of Afghanistan, Angola, Benin, Cambodia, Congo, Egypt, Ethiopia, Grenada, Guinea-Bissau, India, Iraq, Laos, Mozambique, Serbia, Syria and the former Southern part of Yemen.

International membership 

Membership in International Organizations:

Russia holds a permanent seat, which grants it veto power, on the Security Council of the United Nations (UN). Prior to 1991, the Soviet Union held Russia's UN seat, but, after the breakup of the Soviet Union the Russian government informed the United Nations that Russia will continue the Soviet Union's membership at the United Nations and all other UN organs.

Russia is an active member of numerous UN system organizations, including:
 UN General Assembly and Security Council
 Food and Agriculture Organization
 United Nations Conference on Trade and Development
 UN Educational, Scientific and Cultural Organization
 UN Office of the High Commissioner for Refugees
 United Nations Industrial Development Organization
 United Nations Economic Commission for Europe
Russia also participates in some of the most important UN peacekeeping missions, including:

Russia also holds memberships in:

Mediation in international conflicts 
Russia has played an important role in helping mediate international conflicts and has been particularly actively engaged in trying to promote a peace following the Kosovo conflict. Russia's foreign minister claimed on 25 February 2008 that NATO and the European Union have been considering using force to keep Serbs from leaving Kosovo following the 2008 Kosovo declaration of independence.

Russia is a co-sponsor of the Middle East peace process and supports UN and multilateral initiatives in the Persian Gulf, Cambodia, Burma, Angola, the former Yugoslavia, and Haiti. Russia is a founding member of the Contact Group and (since the Denver Summit in June 1997) a member of the G8. In November 1998, Russia joined the Asia-Pacific Economic Cooperation Forum (APEC). Russia has contributed troops to the NATO-led stabilization force in Bosnia and has affirmed its respect for international law and OSCE principles. Russia has accepted UN and OSCE involvement in instances of regional conflict in neighboring countries, including the dispatch of observers to Georgia, Moldova, Tajikistan, and the de facto Republic of Artsakh.

Russia supported, on 16 May 2007, the set up of the international tribunal to try the suspects in the murder of the Lebanese Prime Minister, Rafiq Hariri.

Territorial disputes 
The dispute between Russia and Latvia regarding the Pytalovo (Abrene) area of Pskov Oblast, Russia, was settled in the 27 March 1997 border treaty.
 Disputes over the boundary with the People's Republic of China were finally resolved on 21 July 2008. On that day the Foreign Ministers of the two countries signed an agreement in Beijing. Under the agreement, Russia ceded approximately 174 km2 of territory to China. The territory transferred comprised Tarabarov Island and approximately half of Bolshoy Ussuriysky Island. The area transferred was largely uninhabited. The settlement of their border dispute followed over 40 years of negotiations. The final settlement was the result of the Treaty of Good-Neighborliness and Friendly Cooperation which was concluded on 2 June 2005 and signed by Chinese Foreign Minister Li Zhaoxing and his Russian counterpart, Sergei Lavrov. This followed talks in Vladivostok. There is now no border dispute between Russia and China along their 4300 km border.
 Caspian Sea boundaries are not yet determined among all littoral states. Issues between Russia and the states bordering itAzerbaijan and Kazakhstanwere settled in 2003. Russia has no common land or Caspian-sea border with Turkmenistan and Iran, which do not agree with the Caspian Sea settlements.
 Russia has made no territorial claim in Antarctica, despite being a state that has first discovered that continent (but has reserved the right to make these claims), and does not recognize the claims of any other nation. The Soviet Union signed the Antarctic Treaty in 1960.
 De jure Taiwan asserts that its territory includes all former lands of the Qing empire including Tuva, a part of Russia since 1944. Taiwan does not actively pursue its claim as it lacks any official relationship with Russia, which does not recognize Taiwan as a sovereign nation.

Unresolved

 The Kuril Islands dispute concerns the islands of Iturup, Kunashir, and Shikotan and the Khabomai group, all of which had belonged to the Japanese Empire from 1855 until the Soviet–Japanese War when the Soviet Union occupied them and the southern part of the Sakhalin island since Japan has lost the war. The Russian SFSR, then part of the USSR, got them at the end of the Second World War during the 1945 Yalta Conference, when the Allies agreed to the cession of the islands to the USSR. However, this stipulation was not included in the treaty of Capitulation of Japan which later gave Japan a chance to demand the return of the "controversial northern territories". However, the disputed territory is currently administered by the Russian Federation, and the majority of inhabitants of the disputed territory are supportive of Russian administration, because all the Japanese inhabitants were expelled from the islands in 1946.
 Territorial issues between Estonia and Russia regarding some territories of Pskov and Leningrad Oblast of Russia are still unresolved. The 2005 treaty on Estonia–Russia border was not ratified by the Russian side. Negotiations were reopened in 2012 and the Treaty was signed in February 2014, but ratification is still pending. In March 2022, President Putin sent the Estonian-Russia Border Agreement to the Russian-State Duma to be ratified, but nothing has come of it as of July 2022.
 Disputes over the boundary with Georgia relating to Russia's recognition of Georgian regions, South Ossetia and Abkhazia as independent states, due to the 2008 South Ossetia war and which has led to the severance of all diplomatic relations between them.
 Following the breakup of the Soviet Union, the Russian Federation refused to recognize Ukrainian sovereignty over Sevastopol as well as over the surrounding Crimean Oblast, using the argument that the city was never practically integrated into the Ukrainian SSR because of its military status. This claim was relinquished in the bilateral Peace and Friendship Treaty, which confirmed that both the Crimea and Sevastopol belong to Ukraine. A separate treaty established the terms of a long-term lease of land and resources in and around Sevastopol by Russia. In the Annexation of Crimea by the Russian Federation of early 2014 Crimea was annexed by Russia. Since then status of the Crimea and of the city of Sevastopol is currently under dispute between Russia and Ukraine; Ukraine and the majority of the UN members consider Crimea to be an autonomous republic of Ukraine and Sevastopol to be one of Ukraine's cities with special status, while Russia and other UN members, on the other hand, consider Crimea to be a federal subject of Russia and Sevastopol to be one of Russia's federal cities. On 31 March 2014 the State Duma approved the denunciation of the above-mentioned Peace and Friendship Treaty and long-term lease of land in Sevastopol. Russia officially does not recognize "Crimea question" as a ground for any territorial disputes.

See also 

 Arctic policy of Russia
 Foreign policy of Vladimir Putin
 Foreign relations of the Soviet Union
 Foundations of Geopolitics
 List of diplomatic missions in Russia
 List of diplomatic missions of Russia
 Visa requirements for Russian citizens
 BRICS
 History of Russia (1991–present)

References

Further reading 
 
 
 
 
 
 
 
 Kapoor, Nivedita. "Russia's Relations in Southeast Asia since 2014: Continuity and Change" (ORF Occasional Paper, 2020) online
 Kapoor, Nivedita. "India-Russia ties in a changing world order: In pursuit of a 'Special Strategic Partnership'" (ORF Occasional Paper #2018, 2019) online
 Kozyrev, Andrei. The Firebird: The Elusive Fate of Russian Democracy (U of Pittsburgh Press, 2019); primary source. Andrei Kozyrev was Russian foreign minister 1991-1996.
 
 
 Lund, Aron. "From cold war to civil war: 75 years of Russian-Syrian relations." (Swedish Institute of International Affairs, 2019) online
 
 
 
 
 Rosefielde, Steven. Putin's Russia: Economy, Defence and Foreign Policy (2020) excerpt
 

 Saradzhyan, Simon, and Nabi Abdullaev. "Measuring National Power: Is Putin's Russia in Decline?." Europe-Asia Studies (2020): 1-27. Statistical measures indicate Russia was rising against its Western competitors in 1999–2016 but trailed behind the United States, China and India in absolute national power.
 
 Shen, Zhihua, ed. A Short History of Sino-Soviet Relations, 1917–1991 (Springer Singapore;Palgrave Macmillan, 2020)
 
 
 
 Vasiliev, Alexey. Russia's Middle East Policy: From Lenin to Putin (Routledge, 2018).
 Weiner, Tim. The Folly and the Glory: America, Russia, and Political Warfare 1945–2020 (2020); Pulitzer Prize excerpt
 Wohlforth, William, and Vladislav Zubok. "An abiding antagonism: realism, idealism and the mirage of Western-Russian partnership after the Cold War." International Politics (2017) 54#4 pp 405–419.
 
 
 Ziegler, Charles E. "Russian–American relations: From Tsarism to Putin." International Politics (2014) 51#6 pp: 671–692. online

External links 

  Росія проти України (1990–2016 рр.): від політики шантажу і примусу до війни на поглинання та спроби знищення. – К.: «МП Леся», 2017. – 332 с. 
 "Concept of the Foreign Policy of the Russian Federation", February 2013, Ministry of Foreign Affairs (Russia)
  Ministry of Foreign Affairs of the Russian Federation
 Russia and Its Neighbors from the Dean Peter Krogh Foreign Affairs Digital Archives
 Foreign relations of Russia
 Containing Russia: Back to the Future?, July 2007 article by Russian Minister of Foreign Affairs Sergey Lavrov.

 
Politics of Russia